The 1977 National Soccer League season was the fifty-fourth season under the National Soccer League (NSL) name. The season began in late April and concluded in early October with the Montreal Castors securing the double (First Division title, and NSL Championship) by finishing first in the First Division. The NSL Cup was claimed by Toronto Panhellenic. The Second Division title was won by Toronto Falcons by finishing first in the standings which allowed promotion to the First Division. The NSL was operative in Northern Ontario, Quebec, and had a franchise in the United States in Upstate New York.

Overview 
The National Soccer League (NSL) had intentions of expanding westward with the idea of forming a division in British Columbia. Though the idea never materialized the NSL would ultimately establish an affiliated league in British Columbia with the Pacific Rim Soccer League in the 1986 season. Several changes were approved by the league owners to limit the usage of imports by placing a further restriction on foreign players from five to four. As the league attempted to curve the usage of imports it approved the requirement of every First Division club to field a feeder team in the NSL's youth division. The season produced several controversies as multiple riots and fan violence erupted throughout matches, which were primarily fueled by ethnic rivalries amongst the ethnically associated clubs. One particular match which produced a riot occurred between Toronto Italia, and Toronto Panhellenic supporters which caused Italia to contemplate leaving the league before reconsidering. 

The membership in the league increased to 20 teams with 10 members in both divisions. Hamilton Italo-Canadians and Toronto Croatia were promoted to the First Division, while Hamilton Croatia and Welland Lions departed from the league. St. Catharines Roma with experience in the Inter-City Soccer League purchased Welland's franchise rights, and Toronto Hungaria returned and became based in Mississauga, Ontario. The NSL expanded further into Montreal with the acceptance of the Montreal Stars, and the addition of the Bradford Marshlanders with both clubs operating in the Second Division. Reports were also circulating about the league employing a potential commissioner with Toronto attorney Joe Kane as the primary candidate. Kane served as the league's legal advisor and assisted in drafting the league's new constitution the previous year.

Teams

Coaching changes

Standings

First Division

Second Division

Promotion and relegation matches 
The promotion and relegation system utilized by the National Soccer League operated with the last-placed team in the First Division being automatically relegated, while the Second Division champion would receive an automatic promotion to the First Division. The second last team in the First Division would play in a series of matches against the runner-ups in the Second Division to determine which team would be relegated or promoted.

Matches

References

External links
RSSSF CNSL page
thecnsl.com - 1977 season

1977–78 domestic association football leagues
National Soccer League
1977